Tonhalle is a German word meaning "tone hall", a concert hall. It may refer to:

Tonhalle Düsseldorf
Tonhalle Orchester Zürich
Tonhalle, Zürich, a concert venue

German words and phrases